

List of Ministers of Internal Affairs of Uganda 
Since independence from the United Kingdom on 9 October 1962, Uganda has had the following ministers of internal affairs:

See also 

Ministry of Internal Affairs (Uganda)
Cabinet of Uganda
List of Ministers of Foreign Affairs of Uganda
List of Ministers of Justice and Constitutional Affairs of Uganda

References

External links 

Ministry of Internal Affairs of Uganda Official Website

Uganda
Parliament of Uganda
Lists of Ugandan politicians